Adina Salaoru (born 5 August 1989) is a Romanian volleyball player who plays for CSM București and the Romania national team.

She competed at the 2015 Women's European Volleyball Championship.

She was given the award of Cetățean de onoare ("Honorary Citizen") of the city of Blaj in 2017.

Achievements 
Divizia A1:
Winner (3): 2015, 2016, 2017
Silver Medalist: 2018
Cupa României :
Winner (1): 2017
Finalist: 2018
Supercupa României : 
Finalist: 2016
EHF Champions League: 
Finalist: 2018

Individual awards 
 Romanian Volleyball Player of the Year: 2017

References

External links
Romanian star: Adina Salaoru 
 
Adina Salaoru player profile on Scoresway 

1989 births
Living people
Sportspeople from Miercurea Ciuc
Romanian women's volleyball players
Volleyball players at the 2015 European Games
European Games competitors for Romania
Outside hitters
20th-century Romanian women
21st-century Romanian women